The  was a tag team championship established and promoted by New Japan Pro-Wrestling. It was New Japan Pro-Wrestling's version of the All Asia Tag Team Championship. The first champions were Seiji Sakaguchi and Strong Kobayashi, who defeated Tiger Jeet Singh and Gama Singh in a tournament final. The second and final champions were Tiger Jeet Singh and Umanosuke Ueda, who dethroned the previous champions on July 15, 1977. Both tag teams also won the NWA North American Tag Team Championship at some point during their reigns, but the title was defended separately. The title was retired on April 23, 1981 due to an announcement of the IWGP, a new governing body, which would promote their own-branded championships.

Title history

References 

New Japan Pro-Wrestling championships
Tag team wrestling championships
Continental professional wrestling championships